Thamaasha is a 2019 Indian Malayalam-language drama film written and directed by Ashraf Hamza and produced by Sameer Thahir, Shyju Khalid, Lijo Jose Pellissery and Chemban Vinod Jose.The film stars Vinay Forrt, Chinnu Chandhini,  Divya Prabha and Grace Antony. The music was composed by Rex Vijayan and Shahabaz Aman. The film released in theaters on 5 June 2019. The movie is an official remake of the 2017 Kannada movie Ondu Motteya Kathe.

Plot
Srinivasan, a Malayalam professor with a balding pate is unable to find a suitable woman to marry. After a number of failed attempts, orchestrated by the marriage broker, Srinivasan, persuaded by his friend Rahim, decides to approach women directly. The story of Rahim's marriage with Ameera further encourages Srinivasan in his pursuit of finding love. Srinivasan develops an interest in his colleague, Babitha. As his attempts to court her were proceeding, Babitha takes fancy on the handsome young professor who joins the college. This discourages Srinivasan and he gives up dreams of having a married life. 

Meanwhile he encounters, a muslim woman Safiya who takes an interest in him. However, it turns out that the woman's interest in him was as a potential client to her company, which markets hairpiece for balding individuals. His family, keen to get him married, arranges a meeting with a woman, Chinnu. He appears at the meeting with hairpiece and is dejected to find that Chinnu is obese. After an embarrassing incident in which his hairpiece comes off, he flees, leaving the hairpiece behind. Chinnu meets him to return his hairpiece and on her way back bumps her scooty on an elderly man. Srinivasan, forced by Rahim, accompanies Chinnu to the hospital. Circumstances lead him to stay overnight at the hospital taking care of the old man. He also accompanies Chinnu to drop the man at his home. This incident paves way for further meetings and she invites him to visit biennale art festival being held in Cochin. As a memoir of a well spent evening, Chinnu takes a selfie with Srinivasan, which she posts on her Facebook page. 

The post garners plenty of negative comments emphasising Chinnu 's obesity and Srinivasan's balding pate. Disturbed by the comments and on advice of his colleagues, Srinivasan requests Chinnu to delete the picture. She is reluctant to delete the post and asks him to reconsider. This infuriates him further, and he insists on deleting the picture and puts a stop to further contacts with her. Following the incident, a grief stricken Chinnu uploads a live video on Facebook. In her video she questions the society's mind set towards obese individuals and declares that she is comfortable in her own skin. 

She also accused the society of endangering her relationship with people who stand beside her. On his visit to Rahim's house,Srinivasan is taken aback when he realises Ameera is mute by birth. He repents his actions and on advice of his brother decides to apologise to Chinnu. Srinivasan finds her in a cancer centre where she was a part of 'donate your hair' campaign. He looks at her and complements her new hair style. Together they walk towards a new beginning.

Cast

Vinay Forrt as Srinivasan
Chinnu Chandni as Chinnu
Divya Prabha as Babitha Teacher 
Grace Antony as Safia
John Clarinet as Appukuttan Vaidyar, Srinivasan's father
Uma K.P as sreenivasan 's mother
Arun Kurian as Kamal, Srinivasan's Brother
Navas Vallikkunnu as Raheem
Arya Salim as Ameera
Mersheena Neenu as Guest Appearance

Soundtrack

The music is produced by Rex Vijayan. The song Paadi Njan is composed by Shahabaz Aman, produced and arranged by Rex Vijayan.  The film score is composed and produced by Rex Vijayan along with Yakzan Gary Pereira and Neha Nair. Lyrics were penned by Muhsin Parari.

Reception

Critical reception
Manorama review praised on the film's brilliance in cutting through stereotypes based on looks and exploring aspects of body shaming. The review also commented that its Vinay Forrt's best performance of the year. They also praised Chinnu Chandini's performance and commented for having the heart of Roseanne Conner from Roseanne.

References

External links
 

2019 films
2019 comedy-drama films
Indian comedy-drama films
2010s Malayalam-language films
2019 directorial debut films
Films about social media
Films scored by Shahabaz Aman
Films scored by Rex Vijayan
Malayalam remakes of Kannada films